Chame   is a town and corregimiento in Chame District, Panamá Oeste Province, Panama with a population of 2,432 as of 2010. It is the seat of Chame District. Its population as of 1990 was 1,822; its population as of 2000 was 2,195.

References

Corregimientos of Panamá Oeste Province
Populated places in Panamá Oeste Province